Australomedusa is a genus of hydrozoans belonging to the family Australomedusidae.

The species of this genus are found in Southern Australia.

Species:

Australomedusa baylii 
Australomedusa thrombolites

References

Australomedusidae
Hydrozoan genera